The Mat '24 was a series of electric "locomotives" of the Dutch Railways. After the arrival of electric streamline units in 1935, the name of this equipment became Blokkendozen (Block Boxes), after the angular model. Some NS employees and those interested in the railway invariably spoke of "(electric) buffer equipment", to distinguish it from the streamlined, bufferless electric multiple units of the types Mat '35, Mat '36 and Mat '40. 

The design of this equipment in 1924 made use of the experience gained with the first electrical equipment in the Netherlands, the ZHESM equipment from 1908, which was used on the Rotterdam Hofplein - Scheveningen (Hofplein line) railway line.

Characteristics 
The combinations were more or less fixed, formed with motor carriages and intermediate carriages, usually consisting of two motor carriages in a train circuit and two or three intermediate carriages. The motor carriages were initially equipped with a driving position on one side. To increase the availability, motor vehicles were later also delivered that were equipped with folding bellows, with a cab (small by contemporary standards) next to it.

Due to the presence of buffers and screw couplings, this equipment could also be used in pulled trains. Conversely, other types of carriages, if equipped with controls, could also be used in blokkendoos trains. This was the case from 15 May 1928 onwards in trains on the Oude Lijn, which included CIWL dining cars.

Composition and numbering 
The Blokkendozen are electrical buffer units and consist of a large number of different types of motor vehicles and support vehicles. The total number of blokkendozen produced is 259. Below is an overview of these different subseries:

Original variants

Remodelling in the 1930s 
In the 1930s, some renovations were carried out on Mat '24, so the equipment could cope better with the transport needs of the time. The white-green livery of the trains was changed to green, as it was less contagious to dirt.

Conversion into drawn carriages and separate service carriages 
After the last Blokkendoos was used as electrical buffer unit in 1959, the role of the various (motor) carriages on the railway network was not yet over. Gradually in the 1950s a large part of the equipment was painted blue and used as drawn carriages. The engines and pantographs were removed from the motor carriages. Carriages were used in various passenger trains. In addition, the carriages were used in military leave trains.

In addition to the conversion of numerous carriages and some motor carriages into drawn carriages, some motor carriages with luggage compartments were converted into service carriages for the NS (mDW) and the PTT (Motorposten). The service carriages were used, among other things, for training drivers, ATB measuring carriage and as rail grinding carriage. With the commissioning of 35 new Motorposts in 1965, the Blokkendoos motorposts were taken out of service.

In service 
The mat '24 was initially intended to be used on the Amsterdam - Rotterdam (Old Line) railway line, which was electrified in 1924-'27. In addition, the IJmond line was electrified in 1927. Over time, the mat '24 could be seen on a large part of the electrified network.

Service before 1931 
Until the electrification of the Zaan line in 1931, a total of 193 carriages were available. These carriages were assembled in the following order:

 6 7-multiple units mBD + Bec + Bec + Aec + mCd + Cec + mC
 11 6-multiple units mBD + Bec + Aec + mCd + Cec + mC
 11 8-multiple units mBD + Bec + Aec + mCd + Cec + mC (of which 2 reserve trains)
 4 3-multiple units mBD + CeC + mC (IJmond line)

Service after 1931 
In 1931 there was another delivery in connection with the electrification of the Amsterdam - Alkmaar (Zaanlijn) railway line. Between 1923 and 1932 a total of 130 motor carriages and 129 intermediate carriages were delivered by various factories.

Service during WW2 
The NS had no electric locomotives in service during the Second World War, although contacts with suppliers were already underway and after the war resulted in the 1000 series. In the summer of 1940 there were shortages of steam locomotives for pulling goods trains. Because diesel trains were taken out of service due to a fuel shortage, lack of materials in the workshops, mandatory maintenance of steam locomotives of the Deutsche Reichsbahn and increased transport, more locomotives were needed. Five formations of three motor carriages were made of the Blokkendozen stock for pulling heavy goods trains on the Middennet and the Old Line. With this, the heavy coal trains from the mines in Limburg could be transported to Eindhoven and the west of the Netherlands. In 1942, due to a severe winter and a consequent high defect rate, the shortage of locomotives increased to such an extent that the number of combinations was increased by eight.

Withdrawal 
In the mid-fifties, most of the motor carriages were converted into drawn carriages. In 1959 the Blokkendoos trains were used for passenger transport. The last drawn Blokkendoos carriages ran in a passenger trains in 1972. Subsequently, various carriages were sold to heritage lines, including the Veluwsche Stoomtrein Maatschappij (VSM), the Stoomtrein Goes-Borsele (SGB) and the Zuid limburgse Stoomtrein Maatschapij (ZLSM).

Second Life

Germany 
After the Second World War, several carriages were left behind in the Eastern Bloc. In the 1980s and 1990s, various blokkendoos were found in the former DDR.

Preservation 
In the eighties, an electric museum set was constructed from parts of various carriages, consisting of a motor carriage and a carriage with driver position. This set was completely restored and put into service in 1989. In 1994 an intermediate carriage, equipped with a restoration department, was added to increase the rentability for groups. This equipment is now in the collection of the NSM in Utrecht.

The two-car set initially consisted of the motor carriage mBD 9107 and the control car Ces 8104. The latter carriage never existed before: the series consisted of the Ces 8101 up to and including the Ces 8103, built by Beijnes in Haarlem. A "new" Ces 8104 was added to this series at the end of the 20th century in the main workshop in Amersfoort from various remnants of old blokkendozen carriage for the museum train set: the Ces 8104.

The Cecr 8553 intermediate carriage added later has been given the previously never used designation 'r', for restoration.

One of the motor carriages (the Jaap) was also restored in the 1990s by the main workshop Haarlem as a heritage carriage. This mC 9002 carriage has been restored to the original cream-green color scheme from the 1920s and can form a four-car unit together with the museum set of the Railway Museum.

Jules, originally mBD 9006 motor carriage, the other motor carriage that first bore the name Bromvlieg in 1968 and was renamed Jules in 1969, was converted into an ATB measurement carriage in 1976 and painted in the yellow livery. This carriage was taken out of service in 1992, after which it was acquired by the STIBANS in 1997 and painted in the brown livery as motor mail carriage mP 9204. This carriage is not roadworthy.

The Blokkendoos carriages used by the Stoomtrein Goes-Borsele (SGB) and the Veluwsche Stoomtrein Maatschappij (VSM) are pulled by a steam locomotive. There is also a motor carriage and two drawn carriages without museum status at a campsite in Eext.

On November 3, 2006, a Museum Blokkendoos train consisting of six carriages was driven on the mainline for the first time since the last one was withdrawn. This train consisted of the mC 9002, the three carriages of the Railway Museum and two intermediate carriages of the SGB. This made a trip of more than 1000 km through the country, to raise money for a good cause.

On December 7, 2013, four journeys were made with Blokkendoos carriages on the Zwolle – Lelystad route on the occasion of the first anniversary of the Hanzelijn. 150 inhabitants of surrounding cities received a special train ticket from the Dutch Railways.

Preservation overview

Sources and references 
 Van Wijck Jurriaanse, N.J.: Van stoom tot stroom. De Alk, Alkmaar, 1980. 
 Carel van Gestel, Bert van Reems, Lex Tempelman: Elektrische treinen in Nederland, deel 1. De Alk, Alkmaar, 1992. 
 Stalen rijtuigen van de Nederlandse Spoorwegen - Martijn Haman
 Nicospilt.com - Foto's van Mat '24 - Nico Spilt
 Mat'24 - Materieel 1924 (Blokkendoos) - Railwiki

Passenger railroad cars
Rolling stock of the Netherlands
Pages with unreviewed translations
Locomotives of the Netherlands
Electric locomotives of the Netherlands